Oficina G3 is a Christian metal band from São Paulo, Brazil. Lead vocalist and guitarist Juninho Afram formed the band along with drummer Walter Lopes and bassist Wagner García in 1987. Through their history they have changed their musical style very drastically. Initially they were a heavy metal / hard rock band with influences from Petra and Stryper, then they changed to a more pop rock and metal oriented genre, and recently changing to a more progressive metal driven musical style.

The band is regarded in Brazil as one of the pioneers of Christian rock in that country, and one of the bands which most contributed to the progress of that musical genre. The band has met considerable success, being nominated to Latin Grammy Awards three times recently, in 2005 and in 2007, and winning the 2009 Best Brazilian Christian Album "Depois Da Guerra".

Band members 
 Current

 Juninho Afram — guitar, vocals 
 Jean Carllos — keyboards 
 Duca Tambasco — bass 

 Former
 Mauro Henrique — lead vocals 
 Manga — lead vocals 
 P.G. — lead vocals 
 Walter Lopes — drums 
 Wagner Garcia — bass 
 Woody Carvalho — keyboard 
 Alexandre Aposan — drums 
 Tulio Regis - Lead vocals

Discography
 Studio albums

 Live albums

Videography

 Compilations

References

External links
 
 2009 Latin Grammy Awards
 Facebook

Christian metal musical groups
Brazilian hard rock musical groups
Nu metal musical groups
Latin Grammy Award winners
Brazilian progressive metal musical groups
Musical quintets
Musical groups established in 1987
1987 establishments in Brazil
Brazilian gospel musical groups